The Speaker of the House of Representatives was the presiding officer of the House of Representatives, the lower chamber of the Diet of Hungary.

The House of Representatives was initially established during the Hungarian Revolution of 1848, and existed with interruptions between 1848 and 1918.

List of officeholders

1848–1918
Parties

During the First Hungarian Republic the House of Representatives was replaced by the National Council. During the Hungarian Soviet Republic it was replaced by the National Assembly of Soviets. During the Kingdom of Hungary it was replaced by a unicameral National Assembly between 1920 and 1927. It was re-established between 1927 and 1945.

1927–1945
Parties

See also
 List of speakers of the House of Magnates
 List of speakers of the National Assembly (Hungary)

Sources
  Official website of the National Assembly of Hungary 

 
House of Representatives